The United Baptist Church of Mozambique is a Baptist Christian denomination in Mozambique. The headquarters is in Maputo.

History
The Church has its origins in 1921 with the building of a mission by the Swedish Scandinavian Independent Mission in Maputo. 
In 1970, the Evangelical Baptist Church and the Scandinavian Baptist Mission merged to form the United Baptist Church of Mozambique.  According to a denomination census released in 2006, it claimed 1,178 churches and 400,000 members.

See also 
 Bible
 Born again
 Worship service (evangelicalism)
 Jesus Christ
 Believers' Church

References

Bibliography
- Eric Morier-Genoud, Archives, historiographie et églises évangéliques au Mozambique, Lusotopie, Paris: Karthala, 2000, pp. 621–630.

- Eric Morier-Genoud, Arquivos, historiografia e igrejas evangelicas em Moçambique, Estudos Moçambicanos, Maputo: Université Eduardo Mondlane, n°19, 2001, pp. 137–154

- A.W. Wardin (ed.), Baptists around the World. A Comprehensive Handbook, Nashville (Tennessee), Broadman & Holdman Publishers, 1995 : 52, 53, 413.

- E. Hanson & B. Wennberg, Mission Genom Hundra År, Tidaholm (Sweden), Fribaptisamfundets Förlag, 1991.

Churches in Mozambique
Christian organizations established in 1968
Baptist denominations in Africa
Baptist denominations established in the 20th century
1921 establishments in Mozambique